Maximiliano Hernán Blanco (born 1 August 1977) is an Argentine former football defender.

Blanco began his career in 1996 in the third tier with Club Atlético Tigre. While playing at Victoria, the team gained promotion to the Argentine Nacional B. In 2002 after five seasons with "El Matador", Blanco transferred to Ecuadorian club Deportivo Quito where he played for the whole year before making short spells with Argentine lower division clubs such as Deportivo Español, Temperley, San Martín de Mendoza and Huracán de Tres Arroyos.

In 2007, Blanco signed with Bolivian first division club Blooming. During the 2008 season, Blanco was suspended for 40 games by the Bolivian league for an aggression he committed against a referee after being sent off during a league match. Blanco returned to Argentina and joined Sportivo Italiano, playing there for three years. In 2013, he had a short spell with Barracas Central.

References

External links
 BDFA profile
 profile at Bolivia Gol
 Maximiliano Blanco stats Soccerway

1977 births
Living people
Footballers from Buenos Aires
Association football defenders
Argentine footballers
Club Atlético Tigre footballers
S.D. Quito footballers
Deportivo Español footballers
Club Blooming players
Huracán de Tres Arroyos footballers
Expatriate footballers in Bolivia
Expatriate footballers in Ecuador
Argentine expatriate footballers
Argentine expatriate sportspeople in Ecuador
Argentine expatriate sportspeople in Bolivia